The  was an army of the Imperial Japanese Army. It was raised and demobilized on three occasions.

History
The Japanese 1st Army was initially raised during the First Sino-Japanese War from 1 September 1894 – 28 May 1895 under the command of General Yamagata Aritomo. It participated in all of the major battles of that conflict, and was demobilized at the successful end of that war.

It was revived for the Russo-Japanese War from 2 February 1904 – 9 December 1905 under the command of General Kuroki Tamemoto. Its forces were the first to land in Korea and Manchuria and it fought in most of the major campaigns of the war, including the Battle of Yalu River, Battle of Motien Pass, Battle of Liaoyang, Battle of Shaho, Battle of Sandepu, and Battle of Mukden. It was again demobilized at the end of that conflict.

The Japanese 1st Army was raised again on 26 August 1937 in Tianjin, China under the Japanese China Garrison Army. In addition to protecting the Japanese settlement at Tianjin, it served as a reinforcement to the newly formed Japanese Northern China Area Army following the Marco Polo Bridge Incident during the Second Sino-Japanese War. The 1st Army subsequently participated in various campaigns in North China under the operational command of the Japanese Northern China Area Army, including the North China Incident, Beiping–Hankou Railway Operation, and the Battle of Taiyuan before being demobilized at Taiyuan, Shanxi province after the end of World War II on 30 September 1945.

List of Commanders

Commanding officer

Chief of Staff

References

External links

Notes

01
01
01
1894 establishments in Japan
1945 disestablishments in China